Mattéo Desgouillons (born 21 January 2000) is a French field hockey player.

Club career
Desgouillons played for Girondins de Bordeaux and Montrouge in France. He moved to La Gantoise in the Men's Belgian Hockey League in the summer of 2021.

International career

Junior national team
Mattéo Desgouillons made his debut for the French U–21 team in 2019 at the EuroHockey Junior Championship in Valencia.

In 2021 he won a bronze medal with the team at the FIH Junior World Cup in Bhubaneswar.

Les Bleus
Desgouillons made his debut for Les Bleus in 2021 during a test match against Belgium in Antwerp. He went on to compete at the EuroHockey Championships in Amsterdam later that year. He was also named in the French squad for the season three of the FIH Pro League.

References

External links

2000 births
Living people
French male field hockey players
Male field hockey defenders
Men's Belgian Hockey League players
Place of birth missing (living people)
La Gantoise HC players
2023 Men's FIH Hockey World Cup players